The 2011 Global Kilimanjaro Bowl was the first college football game played on the continent of Africa. The game at the Sheikh Amri Abeid Memorial Stadium in Arusha, Tanzania was played May 21, 2011, due to the seasonal difference in Africa, featuring Drake against Mexican All-Star team CONADEIP. It marked the first NCAA Division I bowl game versus a Mexican opponent since the 1945 Sun Bowl, and the first to be played after the BCS Championship Game. The title sponsor of the game was Global Football, along with counterpart sponsors Iowa Resource for International Service (IRIS), IRIS Youth Exchange & Study Program alumni from Tanzania, Tanapa Partners and Younger Optics.

While in Africa, the teams ran youth camps and worked on orphanage service projects. They also climbed Mount Kilimanjaro before returning to North America. In all, the trip lasted fifteen days.

Bowl game itinerary

Game recap

American Football crossed a new international border when the Drake Bulldogs and CONADEIP Stars from Mexico met on the gridiron painted for the first time on African soil in Arusha, Tanzania. Fans lined up outside Sheikh Amri Abeid Memorial Stadium for at least three hours before kickoff, awaiting an opportunity to see America's version of football played for the first time in Africa.

Drake opened with a steady drive that started at their own 20-yard mark, but the drive stalled when quarterback Mike Piatkowski was intercepted in the corner of the end zone by CONADEIP cornerback Carlos Garcia. The Bulldogs turned the ball over on downs (fourth and inches on the CONADEIP goal line) during the next drive and they took the initial lead their third offensive possession courtesy of a Billy Janssen 27-yard field goal. Injury would sock Drake’s quarterbacking core as Piatkowski was injured in the first quarter and his replacement Tyler Castro (the Bulldogs regular back-up Cody Seeger was unavailable for action) left due to an injury later in the second quarter.

Both teams went scoreless in the second and third quarter. Two promising CONADEIP drives ended frustratingly with failed field goal attempts. CONADEIP also fumbled inside the Drake 10-yard line. Freshman quarterback Nick Ens took his first snaps under center for the Bulldogs due to the injuries of Piatkowski and Castro. Drake would struggle to find an offensive rhythm.

A CONADEIP Dewin Garcia 49-yard pass to Ivan Piña as time expired in the third quarter delighted the capacity crowd, setting up an action filled fourth quarter. Jose Reyes would score the first touchdown of the game on a 5-yards rush to give the Stars a 7-3 lead. Drake would fight back on their ensuing offensive possession. Ens settled into a grove with the Drake offense and sent an 18-yard pass over the middle to wide receiver Joey Orlando on third and long. The gain kept the drive alive leading to the answer touchdown by the Bulldogs, an Ens to Orlando 11-yard pass completed in the corner of the end zone. Having seen Drake regain the lead at 10-7, the CONADEIP offense drove down the field to the Bulldogs 2-yard line, capped by Reyes 37-yard run (he was tripped only two yards short of the end zone). The Stars fumbled on the next possession due to a failed snap from center and the Bulldog defense recovered the loose football. Drake would take advantage of the opportunity, driving 98-yards, resulting in a Patrick Cashmore 2-yard rushing touchdown. The teams would trade possessions from that point. With just over two minutes remaining in the game, Bulldog Matt Buckley intercepted a pass from Garcia to seal the 17-7 Drake victory.

The game was an exhibition and was not included on Drake's record. CONADEIP finished their tour with a 1-2 record. The All-Star team selected from Mexico’s top college players had played two games in Mexico in order to prepare for the bowl. The game was watched by the American Ambassador to Tanzania Alfonso Lenhardt, the nation’s Deputy Minister of Industry and Trade Lazaro Nayland, and a procession of dignitaries.  Maasai tribesmen entertained the crowd where cheerleaders would have danced in an American stadium.

Scoring summary

First Quarter

Drake- Billy Janssen 27 Yard Field Goal

Second Quarter

None

Third Quarter

None

Fourth Quarter

CONADEIP - Jose Reyes 5-Yard Run (Erick Gomez Vargas Kick)

Drake - Nick Ens 11-Yard Pass To Joey Orlando (Billy Janssen Kick)

Drake - Patrick Cashmore 2-Yard Run (Billy Janssen Kick)

See also
 2010 NCAA Division I FCS football season
 List of historically significant college football games

References

Kilimanjaro Bowl
Drake Bulldogs football bowl games
American football in Mexico
2011 in Tanzanian sport
American football in Africa
Student sport in Mexico